Pēteris is a Latvian language masculine given name. It is a cognate of the name Peter and may refer to:

Pēteris Dzelzītis (1921–1948), Latvian soldier and partisan
Pēteris Juraševskis (1872–1945), Latvian politician and former Prime Minister of Latvia
Pēteris Kalniņš (born 1988), Latvian luger and Olympic competitor
Pēteris Lauks (1902–1984), Latvian football defender
Pēteris Pētersons (1923–1998), Latvian playwright, theatre director and drama critic, theorist, translator, journalist and social activist
Pēteris Plakidis (born 1947), Latvian composer and pianist
Pēteris Skudra (born 1973), Latvian professional ice hockey goaltender
Pēteris Stučka (1865–1932), Latvian politician, writer, translator, editor, jurist and president of the Supreme Court of the Soviet Union
Pēteris Vasks (born 1946), Latvian composer
Pēteris Zeltiņš (1914–1994), Latvian racewalker and Olympic competitor

Latvian masculine given names